The ideology of the Iranian Revolution has been called a "complex combination" of Pan-Islamism, political populism, and Shia Islamic "religious radicalism".   

Perhaps the most important of the diverse ideological interpretation of Islam within the grand alliance that led to the 1979 revolution were traditional clerical quietism, Khomeinism, Ali Shariati’s Islamic-left ideology, and Mehdi Bazargan’s liberal-democratic Islam. Less powerful were the socialist guerrilla groups of Islamic and secular variants, and the secular constitutionalism in socialist and nationalist forms.

The slogan chanted by demonstrators—"Independence, Freedom, and Islamic Republic" (Estiqlal, Azadi, Jomhuri-ye Eslami!)
— has been called the "pivotal yet broad demand" of the revolutionaries. Revolutionaries railed against corruption, extravagance and autocratic nature of Pahlavi rule; policies that helped the rich at the expense of the poor; and the economic and cultural domination/exploitation of Iran by non-Muslim foreigners—particularly Americans.

Contributors to the ideology included Jalal Al-e-Ahmad, who formulated the idea of Gharbzadegi—that Western culture must be rejected and fought as was a plague or an intoxication that alienated Muslims from their roots and identity.  Ali Shariati influenced many young Iranians with his interpretation of Islam as the one true way of awakening the oppressed and liberating the Third World from colonialism and neo-colonialism.

Khomeini
The author who ultimately formulated the ideology of the revolution though, was the man who dominated the revolution itself—the Ayatollah Khomeini. He preached that revolt, and especially martyrdom, against injustice and tyranny was part of Shia Islam,  that clerics should mobilize and lead their flocks into action, not just to advise them. He introduced Qur'anic terms—mustazafin ('weak') and mustakbirin ('proud and mighty')—for the Marxist terminology of the oppressors-oppressed distinction.  He rejected the influence of both Soviet and American superpowers in Iran with the slogan  "not Eastern, nor Western - Islamic Republican".

Velayat-e faqih

But even more importantly he developed the ideology of who would run the Islamic Republic, what form of government it would take.  Khomeini believed strongly that Islam required the principle of velayat-e faqih, be applied to government, i.e. that Muslims, in fact everyone, required "guardianship," in the form of rule or supervision by the leading Islamic jurist or jurists—such as Khomeini himself.
This was necessary because Islam requires obedience to traditional Islamic sharia law alone. Following this law was not only the Islamically correct thing to do, it would prevent poverty, injustice, and the plundering of Muslim land by foreign unbelievers. But for all this to happen, sharia had to be protected from innovation and deviation, and this required putting Islamic jurists in control of government.

Establishing and obeying this Islamic government was so important it was "actually an expression of obedience to God," ultimately "more necessary even than prayer and fasting" for Islam because without it true Islam will not survive. It was a universal principle, not one confined to Iran. All the world needed and deserved just government, i.e. true Islamic government, and Khomeini "regarded the export of the Islamic revolution as imperative." However regarding "export of revolution" he stated:  it "does not mean interfering in other nation's affairs", but "answering their questions about knowing God" 

This revolutionary vision of theocratic government was in stark contrast to the quietist Shiism that called for withdrawal from political life, or at least government, until the return of the Mahdi. And needless to say it was in conflict with the hopes and plans of Iran's democratic secularists and Islamic leftists. At the same time Khomeini knew a broad revolutionary base was necessary and did not hesitate to encourage these forces to unite with his supporters to overthrow the Shah.
Consequently, the ideology of the revolution was known for its "imprecision" or "vague character" prior to its victory, with the specific character of velayat-e faqih/theocratic waiting to be made public when the time was right. Khomeini believed the opposition to velayat-e faqih/theocratic government by the other revolutionaries was the result of propaganda campaign by foreign imperialists eager to prevent Islam from putting a stop to their plundering. This propaganda was so insidious it had penetrated even Islamic seminaries and made it necessary to "observe the principles of taqiyya" (i.e. dissimulation of the truth in defense of Islam), when talking about (or not talking about) Islamic government.

This split between the general and the specific elements of the revolution's ideology  inevitably broke down the unity of the revolution as Khomeini abandoned taqiyya and worked determinedly to establish a government led by Islamic clerics, while opponents of theocracy resisted. In the end the break was not fatal. The opposition was defeated and the revolutionary ideology prevailed.

Ideology in practice
Following the revolution, its ideology became apparent in social, economic and cultural policies.

In terms of dress, western-style neckties for men and uncovered hair, arms, and many other areas for women were banned. But there were non-religious changes as well, such as an emphasis on proletarian dress, manners, and customs, as opposed to Western aristocratic or bourgeois elegance and extravagance of the Shah's era.
For example, observers noted in the early days of the revolution the "canteen-like" nature of restaurant meals, meant "to underscore the triumph of the Muslim proletariat." In men's dress, a judge described the "overnight transformation" in February 1979 of the Ministry of Justice in Tehran:
The men were no longer wearing suits and ties but plain slacks and collarless shirts, many of them quite wrinkled, some even stained. Even my nose caught a whiff of the change. The slight scent of cologne or perfume that had lingered in the corridors, especially in the mornings, was absent.

See also
Political thought and legacy of Khomeini
Ruhollah Khomeini
Ali Shariati
Jalal Al-e-Ahmad
History of the Islamic Republic of Iran
Political aspects of Islam
Slogans of the 1979 Iranian Revolution
Political slogans of the Islamic Republic of Iran

References

Bibliography

   

   

'''

Iranian Revolution
Islamism
Islam in Iran
Iranian nationalism